Praanam is a 2003 Telugu fantasy romantic drama film starring Allari Naresh and Sadha in the Lead directed by Malli. The film was released on 25 July 2003. The movie was based on the concept of Reincarnation.

Plot
Then there was a village in coastal area. Sivudu 26 belongs to lower caste and Katyayani 23 is a chaste Brahmin. When the village head 50 (also Sadha's strict Brahmin father) played by Mantripragada Venkat Rao learns that they fell in love, he decides to hang them off because inter-caste love/marriage is a sin as per their village laws and the consequences behind previous experiences regarding inter-caste love. These two souls take a rebirth. Kathyayani is born as Uma 21, a sister of powerful politician 39. Sivudu is born as Kaasi 23, a NRI orphan who returns from Los Angeles to do a Telugu music video album. He is in search of a pristine Telugu girl and he finds Uma. They fall in love, but her politician brother wants her to marry his nephew (also known as his brother-in-law's son) 22. Uma and Kaasi run away from Vizag city to coastal area and incidentally they land in a place where Kathyayani and Sivudu lived. The village men identify them. The rest of the film is all about how all ends well.

Cast
Allari Naresh as Sivudu / Kaasi
Sadha as Kathyayani / Uma
Seetha as Sivudu's mother
Mantripragada Venkat Rao as Kathyayani's strict Brahmin father
Rajan P. Dev in a special appearance
Banerjee as Uma's brother
Shafi as Uma's brother's nephew
Anitha Chowdary
Rallapalli
M. S. Narayana
Kovai Sarala

Soundtrack

The film features music by Kamalakar. The lyrics were penned by Sri Sai Harsha, Suddala Ashok Teja and E. S. Murthy. "Nindu Noorella", was a super hit.

References

External links

2000s Telugu-language films
2003 films